Elodia is a genus of flies in the family Tachinidae.

Species
E. adiscalis Mesnil, 1970
E. ambulatoria (Meigen, 1824)
E. atra (Gardner, 1940)
E. atricans (Herting, 1975)
E. morio (Fallén, 1820)
E. parafacialis (Chao & Zhou, 1992)

References

Exoristinae
Tachinidae genera
Taxa named by Jean-Baptiste Robineau-Desvoidy